Marios Kyriakou (born 13 January 1974) is a retired Cypriot football defender.

References

1974 births
Living people
Cypriot footballers
Apollon Limassol FC players
AEL Limassol players
Ethnikos Achna FC players
Digenis Akritas Morphou FC players
APEP FC players
Association football defenders
Cypriot First Division players
Cyprus international footballers